This is the results breakdown of the local elections held in Catalonia on 25 May 2003. The following tables show detailed results in the autonomous community's most populous municipalities, sorted alphabetically.

Overall

City control
The following table lists party control in the most populous municipalities, including provincial capitals (shown in bold). Gains for a party are displayed with the cell's background shaded in that party's colour.

Municipalities

Badalona
Population: 210,370

Barcelona

Population: 1,527,190

Cornellà de Llobregat
Population: 81,881

Girona
Population: 77,475

L'Hospitalet de Llobregat
Population: 244,323

Lleida
Population: 115,000

Mataró
Population: 109,298

Reus
Population: 91,616

Sabadell
Population: 187,201

Sant Cugat del Vallès
Population: 59,837

Santa Coloma de Gramenet
Population: 115,568

Tarragona
Population: 117,184

Terrassa
Population: 179,300

References

Catalonia
2003